Henicomyia is a genus of stiletto flies in the family Therevidae. There are about seven described species in Henicomyia.

Species
These seven species belong to the genus Henicomyia:
 Henicomyia amazonica Irwin & Webb, 1992 c g
 Henicomyia bicolor Lyneborg, 1972 c g
 Henicomyia diversicolor Lyneborg, 1972 c g
 Henicomyia flava Lyneborg, 1972 c g
 Henicomyia hubbardii Coquillett, 1898 i c g b
 Henicomyia nigra Lyneborg, 1972 c g
 Henicomyia tomentosa Lyneborg, 1972 c g
Data sources: i = ITIS, c = Catalogue of Life, g = GBIF, b = Bugguide.net

References

Further reading

 

Therevidae
Articles created by Qbugbot
Asiloidea genera